Fatu may refer to:

Professional wrestlers
Solofa Fatu Jr. (born 1965), known as Rikishi and Fatu
Edward Smith Fatu (1973–2009), known as Umaga
Jacob Fatu
Jonathan Solofa and Joshua Samuel Fatu (born 1985), known as The Usos
Joseph Fatu (born 1993), known as Solo Sikoa
Sam Fatu (born 1965)
Trinity Fatu (born 1987), known as Naomi

Others
Fatu Gayflor (born 1966), Liberian singer
Fatu Feu'u (born 1946), Samoan artist
Fatu Kekula, Liberian nurse and inventor
Anastasie Fătu (1816–1886), Romanian scientist
Florea Fătu (1924–1995), Romanian footballer
Ilie Fătu (born 1974), Romanian weightlifter
Tufuga Fatu (1914–1981), Western Samoan chief
Mr. Fatu (Fatu Lauoletolo), Samoan singer
Fatu, a northern white rhinoceros

See also
 Fatou (disambiguation)
 Anoa'i family, of which many of the professional wrestlers listed above are a part